The Landwasser is a  river in Switzerland, canton of Graubünden. Its origin was Lake Davos before this was turned into a reservoir for a power station. Nowadays it is prolonged by the creek Flüelabach at its source and changes its name near Davos Dorf. The town of Davos is the largest, uppermost, and, except for the last bit, the only larger settlement on the river. Landwasser empties into the Albula below the village of Filisur.

See also 

 Landwasser Viaduct

Rivers of Switzerland
Rivers of Graubünden